The Public Health Film Society (PHFS), is a charity registered in the UK (no. 1160590). It was established in 2014 by four public health specialist from Oxford - Dr Uy Hoang, Dr Olena Seminog, Dr Sam Williamson and Dr Stella Botchway, most of whom had been involved in the Oxford Public Health Film Club.

The charity was set up with the aim of 'bringing together people from many different backgrounds, to encourage them to share their knowledge, skills, and experience, and be inspired through the medium of film to understand public health, and work towards overcoming the public health challenges we all face'.

PHFS constitution was adopted in 2014 and it was registered with the Charity Commission in 2015.

It is the first and only independent film society devoted to films about health.

The first president was Dr Stella Botchway (2014-2015). She oversaw the adoption of the constitution and the launch of the first ever Public Health Film Festival in the UK. She would later go on to become a researcher at The Oxford Research Centre in the Humanities (TORCH).

The second and current president is Dr Uy Hoang (2015–present). He oversaw the 2nd and 3rd editions of the Public Health Film Festival and the launch of the International Public Health Film Competition. He is a health researcher currently at the University of Oxford.

In addition to helping to organise the Public Health Film Festival and the International Public Health Film Competition, the PHFS undertakes a number of other works to promote conversations between the health and artistic communities about public health messages in film, and to promote transparency in the portray of health messages to the general public. This work includes the distribution of correspondence and peer-reviewed research on health films. The PHFS is an affiliate member of the British Federation of Film Societies.

References

Film societies in the United Kingdom
Mass media in Oxford
Organisations based in Oxford
Film organisations in England
Public health in the United Kingdom
Charities based in England
Health charities in the United Kingdom